108 Main Street is a historic three-storey building in the Lower Falls area of Yarmouth, Maine. Between 1780 and the turn of the 19th century, Lower Falls saw an increase in its population after early settlers gradually moved inland from the area around the Meetinghouse under the Ledge on Gilman Road. 

Standing at the western corner of Main Street and Portland Street, the property was built in the 1860s for Rufus York, who ran a general store out of it with his wife, Zoa. It later became the drug stores of  B. L. Alden, then Melville C. Merrill, then Frank W. Bucknam (1894–1900) on the first floor and William B. Kenniston on the second floor, then (from January 1904) William Hutchinson Rowe. The building was Roger Vaughan's Rexall Pharmacy between 1945 and 1963. (Vaughan's original sign was restored to the Portland Street corner of the building in 2014 but was taken down the following year.)

The building has been the home of Runge's Oriental Rugs since 1990, although the business was established in 1880.

See also 

 Historical buildings and structures of Yarmouth, Maine

References 

Commercial buildings in Yarmouth, Maine
Commercial buildings completed in 1860